Release Arena (previously called Komplett Arena for sponsorship reasons and Sandefjord Arena) is the current stadium of Sandefjord Fotball. It was opened on 21 July 2007, when Lyn visited Sandefjord, and is still the match with the highest attendance of 8,103. 

In 2007, the stadium was named after a club sponsor, the local e-commerce company Komplett. It was named Komplett.no Arena and later Komplett Arena until the company withdrew their naming sponsorship in November 2019.

On 5 May 2021 the stadium was yet again renamed after local mobile phone retailer Release bought the rights.

Attendance

References

External links

 Komplett Arena - Nordic Stadiums

Football venues in Norway
Eliteserien venues
Sports venues completed in 2007
2007 establishments in Norway
Sports venues in Vestfold og Telemark
Buildings and structures in Sandefjord
Sandefjord Fotball